Broadcast Operations Group is an Australian media company, operating radio stations across various centres across regional New South Wales and Queensland, Australia. Branded as the Super Radio Network, stations carry one of two formats – a news talk and classic hits format based at 2SM Sydney; and a hot adult contemporary format based at New FM Newcastle.

In June 2019, the Group acquired 2BS and B-Rock FM in Bathurst from local proprietors Ron and Stephanie Camplin. 2BS immediately replaced its broadcast of The Ray Hadley Morning Show with The John Laws Show, syndicated from 2SM.

Radio stations
 2AD 1134 Armidale
 2BH 567 Broken Hill
 2BS 95.1 Bathurst
 2DU 1251 Dubbo
 2EL 1089 Orange
 2GF 1206 Grafton
 2HC 639 Coffs Harbour (also on 100.5 FM)
 2HD 1143 Newcastle
 2LF 1350 Young
 2LM 900 Lismore
 2MG 1449 Mudgee
 2MO 1080 Gunnedah
 2NZ 1188 Inverell
 2PK 1404 Parkes
 2RE 1557 Taree
 2SM 1269 Sydney
 2TM 1287 Tamworth
 2VM 1530 Moree
 4GY 558 Gympie
 4WK 963 Warwick
 Radio 531/FM 93.5 Kempsey
 Radio 97/FM 104.1 Murwillumbah

A further 17 stations form the FM network, broadcast mainly on FM radio with adult contemporary music and syndicated programming:
 4AK 1242 Oakey
 B-Rock FM 99.3 Bathurst
 FM92.9 Tamworth
 FM100.3 Armidale
 FM104.7 Grafton
 Gem FM 95.1 Inverell
 Hill FM 96.5 Broken Hill
 Max FM 107.3 Taree
 New FM 105.3 Newcastle
 Now FM 98.3 Moree
 Real FM 93.1 Mudgee
 Roccy FM 93.9 Young
 The Rok FM 95.5 Parkes
 Triple G 97.5 Gunnedah
 Zoo FM 92.7 Dubbo
 ZZZ FM 100.9 Lismore

In addition, the Group broadcasts four stations on DAB+ digital radio in Sydney, alongside simulcasting 2SM:
 Fun Super Digi, playing classic hits music
 Dance Super Digi, playing 1990s and 2000s dance music
 Gorilla Radio, playing electronic dance music
 Zoo Super Digi, playing adult contemporary music

Controversy

Senate Inquiry
The BOG was cited in several instances during a Senate Inquiry into Regional Radio. There had been concerns raised as to loss of localism due to networking of radio stations. Bill Caralis was asked to appear several times at various hearings around the country, but never attended.

Local Content
In October 2009, Broadcast Operations Group was named by the ABC's Media Watch program for failing to provide sufficient local content as stipulated by ACMA licence conditions. Media Watch identified three stations; 2HC Coffs Harbour, 2EL Orange and Radio 531 Port Macquarie, which all took the Grant Goldman breakfast show feed out of 2SM in Sydney and failed to meet local content conditions. In response to enquiries by Media Watch, Caralis stated that he believed local news, weather and community announcements played during the Grant Goldman program was sufficient to meet ACMA's licence conditions. As a result, ACMA launched an investigation into the matter. As of November 2009, this investigation was ongoing, however, as of 30 November 2009, the three aforementioned stations commenced broadcasting a three-hour locally produced program from 12 pm weekdays.

Underpayment of staff
Broadcast Operations Group has often been accused of a reluctance to pay experienced staff to cut operating costs.

In September 2009, Broadcast Operations Group was found to have underpaid a journalist and has been ordered to make a $10,000 back payment. The journalist, who was studying communications at a Gold Coast university, worked part-time over a two-year period in the newsroom for Tweed Heads radio station Radio 97 was graded as a cadet. The Fair Work Ombudsman found that the Journalist was performing tasks that would normally be given to a Grade 1, Band 1 journalist under the Commercial Radio Journalists Award.

References

 
Australian radio networks